Pojo Municipality is the second municipal section of the Carrasco Province in the Cochabamba Department, Bolivia. Its seat is Pojo.

Languages 
The languages spoken in the municipality are mainly Quechua and Spanish.

References 

 Instituto Nacional de Estadistica de Bolivia

Municipalities of the Cochabamba Department